Osidryas is a genus of moths in the family Copromorphidae.

Species
Osidryas chersodes Turner, 1913 (originally in Heterocrita)
Osidryas chlorotribes Meyrick, 1939
Osidryas phyllodes Meyrick, 1916

References

Natural History Museum Lepidoptera generic names catalog

Copromorphidae